Riding Mill is a railway station on the Tyne Valley Line, which runs between  and  via . It is owned by Network Rail and managed by Northern Trains.

History
The Newcastle and Carlisle Railway was formed in 1829, and was opened in stages.

Riding Mill was reduced to an unstaffed halt in 1967, along with most of the other stations on the line that escaped the Beeching Axe. The original station buildings on the westbound platform remain as a private residence.

In January 2019, the platforms at the station were extended ahead of the introduction of upgraded rolling stock, as part of the Great North Rail project.

Facilities
The station has two platforms, both of which have a ticket machine (which accepts card or contactless payment only), seating, waiting shelter, next train audio and visual displays and an emergency help point. Platforms are linked by a pre-grouping metal footbridge, similar to those at Haltwhistle and Wetheral, meaning there is step-free access to the Carlisle-bound platform only. There is a small car park and cycle storage at the station.

Riding Mill is part of the Northern Trains penalty fare network, meaning that a valid ticket or promise to pay notice is required prior to boarding the train.

Services

All services are operated by Northern Trains.

Rolling stock used: Class 156 Super Sprinter and Class 158 Express Sprinter

References

External links
 
 

Railway stations in Northumberland
DfT Category F2 stations
Former North Eastern Railway (UK) stations
Railway stations in Great Britain opened in 1835
Northern franchise railway stations